Indoor Recreation of Orleans County, called IROC, was a not-for-profit recreation center for the people of Orleans County, Vermont. It was located off US 5, the Newport-Derby Road, in Derby, Vermont. The President was Phil White.

5,000 people visited IROC 150,000 times (total) in 2006. The indoor rotary track is open to the public for free. There were 25,000 visits to it in 2006.

In 2007, Vermont Governor Jim Douglas gave IROC the Healthy Aging Award as Organizational Champion.

It closed for lack of financing in 2012. A building supply chain bought the building.

Outdoor events
IROC sponsored a summer series of outdoor events including The Dandelion Run Half Marathon in support of  the Victims Assistance fund, The Tour de Kingdom Bike Race, The Kingdom Swim and triathlon at the end of the summer.

Funding
The building cost $6.3 million. The association raised $4 million in donations and grants. In 2007, $2.3 million was still needed to fully pay for the building. The association was paying $100,000 annually in interest charges.

Footnotes

External links
Official website

Buildings and structures in Derby, Vermont
Health clubs in the United States
Organizations established in 2006
Organizations disestablished in 2013
Medical and health organizations based in Vermont
2006 establishments in Vermont
2013 disestablishments in Vermont